Mutual Friends is the debut album by Swiss-German pop duo BOY. It was released on September 2, 2011, by Grönland Records. It was later released in the UK by Decca Records in June 2012. In February 2013, Nettwerk Records released it in North America. Of the album's twelve tracks, three became singles. Both of the band's music videos, "Little Numbers" and "Oh Boy" came from this album as well. The album received the 2012 European Border Breakers Award.

Track listing 
All song were written by BOY and produced by Philipp Steinke.

Personnel
Valeska Steiner - vocals, percussion, acoustic guitar, Melodica
Sonja Glass - bass, acoustic guitar, programming, banjo, cello, organ
Philipp Steinke - guitar, piano, keyboards
Carl-Michael Grabinger, Thomas Hedlund, Bela Brauckmann, Marco Römer - drums
Christian Kreutzer - guitar, banjo
Jörg Sander, Deniz Erarslan, Thomas Hahn  - guitar
Percussion - Marco Möller
Vibraphone - Eric Darken

Additional musicians:
Choir - Jule Escherhaus
Viola - John Catchings, Kris Wilkinson
Violin - David Angell, David Davidson
Clarinet - Taco Van Hettinga
French Horn - Stefan Jon Bernharosson
Trombone - Helgi Hrafn Jonsson, Jessica Buzbee
Trumpet - Ari Bragi Karason
Tuba - Timothy Buzbee

Other:
Mario Lombardo - Artwork

Recorded & produced at Hahn & Hahn, LowSwing Tonstudio, Zwischengeschoss
Mastering at Skyline Tonfabrik by Jens Dreesen, Kai Blankenberg

Credtis as per discogs

Charts

Weekly charts

Year-end charts

References

External links 
 

2011 debut albums
Boy (duo) albums
Decca Records albums
Grönland Records albums
Nettwerk Records albums
European Border Breakers Award-winning albums